Kingsman or King's man may refer to:

 Kingsman (rank), a British Army rank

Arts and media
Kingsman (franchise)
Kingsman (comic series), the basis for the franchise
Kingsman: The Secret Service, a 2014  British spy-comedy film
Kingsman: The Secret Service (soundtrack)
Kingsman: The Golden Circle, a 2017 action spy−comedy film and sequel to the previous Kingsman film
The King's Man, a 2021 prequel to the previous Kingsman films
King's Man, a 2011 novel in the Outlaw Chronicles series by Angus Donald

People
 Paul Kingsman MBE (born 1967), New Zealand Olympic swimmer
 John Kingsman Beling (1919–2010), United States Navy rear admiral

Other
Kingsman SC, a Canadian soccer team

See also
 The Kingsmen, an American 1960s beat/garage rock band
 Kingman (disambiguation)
 King's Men (disambiguation)